The Mount Cameroon Race of Hope (in French, "La Course de l'Espoir") is an annual, televised footrace held at Mount Cameroon in the Southwest Region of Cameroon in  January or February. The 20th edition of the Guinness mount Cameroon race of hope was scheduled for February 14, 2015. The information was made public in a joint press conference granted by the president of the Cameroon Athletics federation, Emmanuel Motomby Mbome and the General manager of Guinness Cameroun, Baker Magunda.
During the Press Conference it was made known that the mode of registration and price (10 million FCFA) remain the same but there will be several innovations this year notably the Olympic flame that would go round the country prior to the race. 

The flame of hope will visit every qualifier race notably in Ngaoundere, then move to Batie, Bamenda, Yaounde, Douala, and finally Buea. On each lap of the tour, Guinness Cameroon will carry out some activities of general interest such as constructing water catchments, schools and hospitals. Participants are divided into men's and women's divisions and further subdivided into professionals, youth, and casual runners. Each winner in the men's and women's professional divisions will receive 10,000,000  francs CFA in 2011. Teams may enter the race and compete in the relay division. The first Race of Hope was in 1995. Since then, participation has steadily increased; there were 214 participants in 2005, 390 in 2006, and 643 from nine countries in 2007. As of 2010, the winners since the race's inception had all been Cameroonians. Sarah Etonge has won the women's division for four straight years.

The first race took place in 1973. For many years, the race was organised and sponsored by Guinness under the name Guinness Mount Cameroon Race. In 2005, control of the event was taken by 12 local committees in Buea and representatives of the national Cameroon Athletics Federation (CAF) and the Ministry of Sports and Physical Education. The budget in 2007 was 130 million francs CFA, the bulk of which was provided by the Ministry of Sports and Physical Education. The change to public control was controversial: In 2005, Mayor Charles Mbella Moki of the Buea Rural Council accused the organisers of mismanagement and proposed that Guinness to be given back full control. In 2006, the CAF cut the prize money to the winners by 25% without warning, reportedly to cover their membership fees in the organisation.

About 5,000 visitors come to Buea each year to view the race. Cultural and sporting events take place in Buea. These include artists, choral groups, and dancers; and basketball, handball, and volleyball tournaments. Local authorities sanction the event through the paramount chief of Buea, who climbs Mount Cameroon to petition the gods for their blessing.

The 2007 documentary film Volcanic Sprint is about the race.

The 2019 race saw marginal attendance due to the ongoing Anglophone Crisis.

During the 2023 edition, nineteen athletes were injured when small bombs exploded during the race.

Notes

References
 Constantine N. Mbufung view my profile  (26 December 2014). Benly Anchunda '2015 MOUNT CAMEROON RACE OF HOPE SCHEDULED FOR 14TH FEBRUARY'. CRTV News 06/12/2014
 Efande, Peter (16 February 2007). "Ange Sama: 'We've Increased The Financial Package For Winners'". Cameroon Tribune. Accessed 20 February 2007.
 Jones, Emma (no date). "Mount Cameroon Race of Hope Marathon", Pilot Destination Guide. Accessed 1 August 2008.
 Mbonwoh, Nkeze (16 February 2007). "All Set for Sunday's Race of Hope". Cameroon Tribune. Accessed 20 February 2007.
 Mbonwoh, Nkeze (10 February 2010). "Modification of Race of Hope - Decision Suspended". "allAfrica.com". Accessed 11 February 2010.
 Mbous, Jacques Sebastien (6 January 2011).  "16eme Edition de la Course de l'Espoir." Official Note from Cameroon Athletic Federation, 6 January 2011. 
 Nana, Walter Wilson (24 February 2005). "Buea Wants Guinness To Manage Race Of Hope - Mayor". The Post Online. Accessed 21 February 2007.
 Nana, Walter Wilson (13 January 2006). "Race Of Hope Winner To Bag FCFA 3 Million". The Post Online. Accessed 21 February 2007.
 Nana, Walter Wilson, and Innocent Mbunwe (27 February 2006). "2006 Mount Cameroon Race Of Hoope: Winners Angry With 25% Prize Slash". The Post Online. Accessed 21 February 2007.
 Nana, Walter Wilson, and Innocent Mbunwe (1 March 2005). "Race Of Hope: Teacher Is New Champion, Etonge Confirms 'Queen Of The Mountain' Supremacy". The Post Online. Accessed 21 February 2007.
 Vubem, Fred (14 February 2007). "Mt. Cameroon Race Mixed Commission Evaluates Preparations". Cameroon Tribune. Accessed 20 February 2007.
 ----- (no date) "Volcanic Sprint". imdb.com. Accessed 11 February 2007.

Mount Cameroon
Recurring sporting events established in 1995
Marathons in Africa
Sport in Cameroon
Mountain running competitions
1995 establishments in Cameroon